Krông Năng may refer to several places in Vietnam, including:

Krông Năng District, a rural district of Đắk Lắk Province
Krông Năng, Đắk Lắk, a township and capital of Krông Năng District
, a rural commune of Krông Pa District